The Ministry of Equality may refer to:

Minister for Gender Equality (Denmark)
Ministry of Gender Equality, Child Development and Family Welfare (Mauritius)
Ministry of Gender Equality and Family (South Korea)
Ministry of Equality (Spain)
Ministry of Integration and Gender Equality (Sweden)
Minister for Women and Equalities (UK)